Joel Selanikio is a well-known American physician, attending pediatrician, and assistant professor of pediatrics at Georgetown University Hospital

Education 

Selanikio graduated from Haverford College, Philadelphia, in 1986. He then started to work for Chase Manhattan as a systems analyst. He has also completed a degree in medicine at Brown University and did his residency in Atlanta, Georgia.

Career 

After his residency in Atlanta, Selanikio started to work for the Centers for Disease Control and Prevention. He then left his job there to start DataDyne.org, a company that made open-source software for collecting data on public health.

After the 2004 Indian Ocean earthquake and tsunami, Selanikio has also worked with the International Rescue Committee in Aceh, Indonesia. In 2014–2015, during the Ebola epidemic in Sierra Leone, he worked with the International Medical Corps in Lunsar.

Presentations 

 TED (2013)
 Ivey Global Health Conference (2013)
 Royal Society of Medicine Lecture (2011)
 World Economic Forum “Tech for Society” Panel, Davos (2010)
 Lemelson-MIT Innovation Prize Lecture (2009)

Recognition 

 ComputerWorld 21st Century Achievement Award (2012)
 Fast Company Magazine Social Enterprise of the Year (2009)
 Wall Street Journal Award for Technological Innovation in Healthcare (2009)
 Lemelson-MIT Prize $100,000 Award for Sustainable Innovation (2009)
 Tech Museum Award for Health (2008)
 Stockholm Challenge (2008)
 Haverford College Award (2005)

References 



Living people
Haverford College alumni
Alpert Medical School alumni
Year of birth missing (living people)